Ferdinand VII (14 October 1784 – 29 September 1833) was a King of Spain during the early 19th century. He reigned briefly in 1808 and then again from 1813 to his death in 1833. He was known to his supporters as el Deseado (the Desired) and to his detractors as el Rey Felón (the Felon/Criminal King).

Born in Madrid at El Escorial, Ferdinand VII was heir apparent to the Spanish throne in his youth. Following the 1808 Tumult of Aranjuez, he ascended the throne. That year Napoleon overthrew him; he linked his monarchy to counter-revolution and reactionary policies that produced a deep rift in Spain between his forces on the right and liberals on the left. Back in power in December 1813, he re-established the absolutist monarchy and rejected the liberal constitution of 1812. A revolt in 1820 led by Rafael del Riego forced him to restore the constitution, starting the Liberal Triennium, a three-year period of liberal rule. In 1823 the Congress of Verona authorized a successful French intervention, restoring him to absolute power for the second time. He suppressed the liberal press from 1814 to 1833, jailing many of its editors and writers.

Under his rule, Spain lost nearly all of its American possessions, and the country entered into a large-scale civil war upon his death. His political legacy has remained contested since his death; some historians regard him as incompetent, despotic, and short-sighted.

Early life

Ferdinand was the eldest surviving son of Charles IV of Spain and Maria Luisa of Parma. Ferdinand was born in the palace of El Escorial near Madrid. In his youth Ferdinand occupied the position of an heir apparent who was excluded from any participation in government by his parents and their favourite advisor and Prime Minister, Manuel Godoy. National discontent with the government produced a rebellion in 1805. In October 1807, Ferdinand was arrested for his complicity in the El Escorial Conspiracy in which the rebels aimed at securing foreign support from the French Emperor Napoleon. When the conspiracy was discovered, Ferdinand submitted to his parents.

1st reign and abdication

Following a popular riot at Aranjuez Charles IV abdicated in March 1808. Ferdinand ascended the throne and turned to Napoleon for support. He abdicated on 6 May 1808, and thereafter Napoleon kept Ferdinand under guard in France for six years at the Château de Valençay. Historian Charles Oman records that the choice of Valençay was a practical joke by Napoleon on his former foreign minister Talleyrand, the owner of the château, for his lack of interest in Spanish affairs.

While the upper echelons of the Spanish government accepted his abdication and Napoleon's choice of his brother Joseph Bonaparte as king of Spain, the Spanish people did not. Uprisings broke out throughout the country, marking the beginning of the Peninsular War. Provincial juntas were established to control regions in opposition to the new French king.  After the Battle of Bailén proved that the Spanish could resist the French, the Council of Castile reversed itself and declared null and void the abdications of Bayonne on 11 August 1808. On 24 August, Ferdinand VII was proclaimed king of Spain again, and negotiations between the council and the provincial juntas for the establishment of a Supreme Central Junta were completed. On 14 January 1809 the British government acknowledged Ferdinand VII as king of Spain.

2nd reign

Restoration
Five years later after experiencing serious setbacks on many fronts, Napoleon agreed on 11 December 1813 to acknowledge Ferdinand VII as king of Spain, and signed the Treaty of Valençay so that the king could return to Spain. The Spanish people, blaming the policies of the Francophiles (afrancesados) for causing the Napoleonic occupation and the Peninsular War by allying Spain too closely to France, at first welcomed Fernando. Ferdinand soon found that in the intervening years a new world had been born of foreign invasion and domestic revolution. In his name Spain fought for its independence and in his name as well juntas had governed Spanish America. Spain was no longer the absolute monarchy he had relinquished six years earlier. Instead he was now asked to rule under the liberal Constitution of 1812. Before being allowed onto Spanish soil, Ferdinand had to guarantee the liberals that he would govern on the basis of the constitution, but only gave lukewarm indications he would do so.

On 24 March the French handed him over to the Spanish Army in Girona, and thus began his procession towards Madrid. During this process and in the following months, he was encouraged by conservatives and the Church hierarchy to reject the constitution. On 4 May he ordered its abolition, and on 10 May had the liberal leaders responsible for the constitution arrested. Ferdinand justified his actions by claiming that the constitution had been made by a Cortes illegally assembled in his absence, without his consent and without the traditional form. (It had met as a unicameral body, instead of in three chambers representing the three estates: the clergy, the nobility and the cities.) Ferdinand initially promised to convene a traditional Cortes, but never did so, thereby reasserting the Bourbon doctrine that sovereign authority resided in his person only.

Meanwhile, the wars of independence had broken out in the Americas, and although many of the republican rebels were divided and royalist sentiment was strong in many areas, the Manila galleons and the Spanish treasure fleets – carrying tax revenues from the Spanish Empire – were interrupted. Spain was all but bankrupt.

Ferdinand's restored autocracy was guided by a small camarilla of his favorites, although his government seemed unstable. Whimsical and ferocious by turns, he changed his ministers every few months. "The king," wrote Friedrich von Gentz in 1814, "himself enters the houses of his prime ministers, arrests them, and hands them over to their cruel enemies;" and again, on 14 January 1815, "the king has so debased himself that he has become no more than the leading police agent and prison warden of his country."

The king did recognize the efforts of foreign powers on his behalf. As the head of the Spanish Order of the Golden Fleece, Ferdinand made the Duke of Wellington, head of the British forces on the peninsula, the first Protestant member of the order.

During the aftermath of the Mexican War of Independence, the general of the Army of the Three Guarantees, Agustín de Iturbide, and Jefe Superior Juan O'Donojú, signed the Treaty of Córdoba, which concluded the war of independence and established the First Mexican Empire. The imperial constitution contemplated that the monarch would be "a Spanish prince," and Iturbide and O'Donojú intended to offer the Mexican Imperial Crown to Ferdinand VII himself to rule Mexico in personal union with Spain. However, Ferdinand, refusing to recognize Mexican independence or be bound by a constitution, decreed that the Mexican constitution was "void", declined the Mexican crown, and stated that no European prince could accede to the Mexican throne. The imperial crown was consequently given to Iturbide himself, but the Mexican Empire collapsed and was replaced by the First Mexican Republic a few years later.

Revolt

There were several military uprisings, or pronunciamientos during the king's second reign. The first, in September 1814, shortly after the end of the Peninsular War (June 1814), was General Espoz y Mina (Pamplona, 1814). Then, the following year, Juan Diaz Porlier (La Coruña, 1815). In 1817, General Luis Lacy (Barcelona, 1817), followed by General Juan Van Halen's (Valencia, 1818). These were followed by the most successful pronunciamiento, the one that led to the Trienio Liberal, that of Rafael del Riego, in 1820.

In 1820 a revolt broke out in favor of the Constitution of 1812, beginning with a mutiny of the troops under Riego. The king was quickly taken prisoner. Ferdinand had restored the Jesuits upon his return, but now they had become identified with repression and absolutism among the liberals, who attacked them: twenty-five Jesuits were slain in Madrid in 1822. For the rest of the 19th century, liberal political regimes expelled the Jesuits, and authoritarian regimes reinstated them.

In the spring of 1823, the restored Bourbon French King Louis XVIII of France invaded Spain, "invoking the God of St. Louis, for the sake of preserving the throne of Spain to a fellow descendant of Henry IV of France, and of reconciling that fine kingdom with Europe." In May 1823 the revolutionary party moved Ferdinand to Cádiz, where he continued to make promises of constitutional amendment until he was free.

When Ferdinand was freed after the Battle of Trocadero and the fall of Cádiz, reprisals followed. The Duc d'Angoulême made known his protest against Ferdinand's actions by refusing the Spanish decorations Ferdinand offered him for his military services.

During his last years, Ferdinand's political appointments became more stable. The last ten years of his reign (sometimes referred to as the Ominous Decade) saw the restoration of absolutism, the re-establishment of traditional university programs and the suppression of any opposition, both by the Liberal Party and by the reactionary revolt (known as "War of the Agraviados") which broke out in 1827 in Catalonia and other regions.

Death and succession crisis
As Ferdinand lay dying, his new wife Maria Christina of Bourbon-Two Sicilies had him set aside the Salic Law which would have made his brother Don Carlos heir to the throne instead of any female, so that Ferdinand was succeeded by his infant daughter Isabella II. Carlos revolted and said he was the legitimate king. Needing support, Maria Christina, as regent for her daughter, turned to the liberals. She issued a decree of amnesty on 23 October 1833. Liberals who had been in exile returned and dominated Spanish politics for decades, leading to the Carlist Wars.

Marriages

Ferdinand VII married four times as his first three wives died. In 1802, he married his first cousin Princess Maria Antonia of Naples and Sicily (1784–1806), daughter of Ferdinand I of the Two Sicilies and Marie Caroline of Austria. Her two pregnancies in 1804 and 1805 ended in miscarriages.

In 1816, Ferdinand married his niece Maria Isabel of Portugal (1797–1818), daughter of his older sister Carlota Joaquina and John VI of Portugal. They had a daughter who  lived only five months, and a stillborn daughter.

On 20 October 1819, in Madrid, Ferdinand married Princess Maria Josepha Amalia of Saxony (1803–1829), daughter of Maximilian, Prince of Saxony, and Caroline of Parma. They had no children.

Lastly, on 27 May 1829, Ferdinand married another niece, Maria Christina of the Two Sicilies (1806–1878), daughter of his younger sister Maria Isabella of Spain and Francis I of the Two Sicilies, who was his first cousin and the brother of his first wife. They had two surviving daughters, the older of whom succeeded Ferdinand upon his death.

Issue

Honours

Legacy
Ferdinand VII's reign is typically criticized by historians, even in his own country. Historian Stanley G. Payne wrote that Ferdinand was "in many ways the basest king in Spanish history. Cowardly, selfish, grasping, suspicious, and vengeful, D. Fernando seemed almost incapable of any perception of the commonweal."

Ancestry

References

Works cited
 Carr, Raymond. Spain, 1808–1975 (1982)
 
 Payne, Stanley G. History of Spain and Portugal: v. 2 (1973) pp. 415–436

Further reading
 Clarke, Henry Butler. Modern Spain, 1815–1898 (1906) pp 1–92; old but full of factual detail online

External links

 Historiaantiqua. Fernando VII at Historia Antiqua 

|-

|-

1784 births
1833 deaths
19th-century Spanish monarchs
19th-century Navarrese monarchs
Nobility from Madrid
Princes of Asturias
House of Bourbon (Spain)
Burials in the Pantheon of Kings at El Escorial
19th-century Roman Catholics
19th century in Spain
Spanish captain generals
Grand Masters of the Order of the Golden Fleece
Knights of the Golden Fleece of Spain
Grand Masters of the Order of Isabella the Catholic
Collars of the Order of Isabella the Catholic
Knights Grand Cross of the Order of Isabella the Catholic
Laureate Cross of Saint Ferdinand
Grand Masters of the Royal and Military Order of San Hermenegild
Grand Crosses of the Royal and Military Order of San Hermenegild
Grand Masters of the Order of Calatrava
Knights of Calatrava
Grand Masters of the Order of Santiago
Knights of Santiago
Grand Masters of the Order of Alcántara
Knights of the Order of Alcántara
Grand Masters of the Order of Montesa
Knights of the Order of Montesa
Extra Knights Companion of the Garter
Grand Crosses of the Order of Saint Stephen of Hungary
3
3
3